Vajreshwari also known as Vajrabai is a village situated near the Tansa River in the Bhiwandi taluk of Thane district, Maharashtra, India. It is famous for the Vajreshwari Temple and hot water springs.

The village used to be called Vadvali but was later renamed Vajreswari in respect of the Goddess Vajreshwari, the presiding deity of the Vajreshwari Temple. The village consists mainly of the local Marathi community and the tribes living in the nearby forest. The village Vajreshwari is believed to have been formed as a result of volcanic eruption.

References

External links
Official Website of Thane district

Cities and towns in Palghar district